Psyche Abandoned may refer to:
 Psyche Abandoned (painting)
 Psyche Abandoned (sculpture)